The 2016 National Ringette League Playoffs were the postseason tournament of 2015-16 National Ringette League season. Cambridge Turbos wins the fifth title.

Regular Season Standing

Format 

Same as last season except the knockout stage.

In the past, 8 teams from East played, but West became 4 teams, bottom 2 from West will compete in knockout stage.

The draws are E3 vs E8, E4 vs E7, E5 vs E6 and W3 vs W4.

Knockout stage
E stands for east and W stands for west.

(E3) Atlantic vs (E8) Bourassa 
Game 1

Atlantic leads the series 1-0

Game 2

Atlantic wins the series 2-0

(E4) Gloucester vs (E7) Gatineau 
Game 1

Gloucester leads the series 1-0

Game 2

Gloucester wins the series 2-0

(E5) Ottawa vs (E6) Richmond Hill 
Game 1

Ottawa leads the series 1-0

Game 2

Ottawa wins the series 2-0

(W3) BC vs (W4) Black Gold 
Game 1

Black Gold leads the series 1-0

Game 2

BC ties the series 1-1

Game 3

Black Gold wins the series 2-1

Elite Eight 
All games played at Western Fair Sports Centre and Earl Nichols Park, all located at London, Ontario from April 4 to 8.
x indicates clinches semifinal.
y indicates clinches final directly.

Semifinal 

Cambridge goes to the final

Final

Roster 
Cambridge Turbos
  Findlay, Melissa
  Campbell, Taylor
  Wouters, Sharolyn 
  Welsh, Abigail
  Gaudet, Jennifer 
  Musetti (Nosal), Samantha 
  Dupuis, Jenna 
  Granger, Sydney 
  Wise, Jaclyn 
  Adams, Sheri 
  Gaudet, Jacqueline
  Nosal, Paige 
  McCullough, Samantha 
  Jasper, Elyssa 
  Denstedt, Josslyn
  Nosal, Sydney
  Callander, Jessie (goalie)

Glocester Devils
 McGonigal, Lauren
 van Koppen, Jenna
 Youldon, Kaitlyn
 Mainwood, Jessica
 Thompson, Brianna
 Scapillati, Dom
 Woods, Darcy
 Biewald, Allison
 Gour, Amanda
 Mulders, Katherine
 O'Brien, Alison 
 Marcotte, Allie 
 Hagan, Colleen
 Youldon, Kelsey
 LeBlanc, Jasmine (goalie)

Leaders 
Player except goalie
Goal 
 East: Jacqueline Gaudet (18, CAM)
 West: Dailyn Bell, Shaundra Bruvall, Tori Hart (9, first is EDM and last two are CGY)
Assist
 East: Taylor Cambell (20, CAM)
 West: Justine Exner (13, CGY)
 Point
 East: Kelsey Youldon (31, CAM)
 West: Shaundra Bruvall (20, CGY)
Goalie
Saving %
East Jasmine LeBlanc (.894, GLO)
West Amy Clarkson (.907, BC)
Goals against average
East Danni Walser (2.50, CAM)
West Jessi Daniels (3.53, EDM)
Win
East Jasmine LeBlanc (9, GLO)
West Jessi Daniels (3, EDM)

References 

Ringette
National Ringette League